Dracula felix is a species of orchid.

felix
Plants described in 1978